The 1928 Capital Football season was the third Capital Football season. There was only one ACT competition played which was the FCTSA League and was won by Queanbeyan by a 2-point margin.

1928 FCTSA League

The 1928 FCTSA League was the third season of the FCTSA League, the former top soccer league in the Capital Football.

Teams
 Ainslie
 Burns
 Kingston
 Queanbeyan

League table

Results

References

External links
 Official Website

1928 in Australian soccer